Pelican Lake 191A is an Indian reserve of the Pelican Lake First Nation in Saskatchewan. It is 66 kilometres southeast of Meadow Lake. In the 2016 Canadian Census, it recorded a population of 20 living in 3 of its 6 total private dwellings.

References

Pelican Lake First Nation
Indian reserves in Saskatchewan
Division No. 16, Saskatchewan